Asteria de Sa was an athlete from Pakistan. She was the first national champion in long jump.

Background
de Sa was educated at St. Joseph's Convent School in Karachi. She was involved with the girl guides from the 1930s.

Career
de Sa represented Sindh province at the 1st Pakistan Olympics (now National Games) held at the Polo Ground in Karachi. She participated in both track: relay and 100 yards as well as field events: long jump and javelin. de Sa also later served as manager of the Sindh Women Team at the National Games held in Montgomery (now Sahiwal) and Dacca (now Dhaka).

References

Pakistani female long jumpers
Sportspeople from Karachi
Year of birth missing
Possibly living people